

References

Beer in the United Kingdom
United Kingdom cuisine-related lists